Craig C. White (born October 8, 1961) is a former professional American football wide receiver in the National Football League (NFL). He attended Missouri and played with the Buffalo Bills in 1984.

External links
Pro-Football Reference

1961 births
Living people
Sportspeople from St. Joseph, Missouri
Players of American football from Missouri
Buffalo Bills players
Missouri Tigers football players
American football wide receivers